The Latvian minority in Lithuania numbered 2,025 persons at the 2011 census, and at 0.07% of the total population of Lithuania, being the 9th biggest national minority. The Latvian national minority in Lithuania has a long history.

According to the 2011 census, 46.2% of Latvians speak Latvian as their mother tongue, while Lithuanian is native for 27.8%, Russian - 14.6% of Latvians. 3.95% of Latvians are bilingual in terms that they have 2 mother tongues.

Cities with a relatively significant Latvian proportion:
Palanga – 0.97%
Naujoji Akmenė – 0.55%

Famous Lithuanians of Latvian descent
Romualdas Ozolas, a nationalist thinker
Baiba Skurstene, a Lithuanian-Latvian singer

See also
 Kursenieki
 Ethnic minorities in Lithuania
 Latvia–Lithuania relations

References

External links 

Ethnic groups in Lithuania
Lithuania